The Cal State Bakersfield Roadrunners men's soccer team represents California State University, Bakersfield in all NCAA Division I men's college soccer competitions. The Roadrunners play in the Western Athletic Conference.

Coaching staff 
As of March 22, 2019.

Championships

Conference Regular Season Championships

Conference Tournament Championships

Rivalries 
CSUB's primary rivals are Cal St. L.A. and Cal Poly Pomona, whom they have played the most matches against.

Coaching records

Postseason

NCAA Division I Tournament results 
CSUB has appeared in one NCAA Division Tournaments. Their record is 0–1–0.

NCAA Division II Tournament results 
CSUB has appeared in seven NCAA Division II Tournaments. Their record is 4–5–2.

See also 
 Cal State Bakersfield Roadrunners women's soccer

References

External links 
 

 
Association football clubs established in 1967
1967 establishments in California